Turkish National Olympic Committee (TNOC) is the governing Olympic body of Turkey. It is based in Istanbul.

History
As one of the oldest National Olympic Committees in the world, TNOC was founded on the era of the Ottoman Empire in 1908 on the name Ottoman National Olympic Society and recognised by the IOC in 1911.

Presidents

Ottoman National Olympic Society

Turkish National Olympic Committee

Secretary Generals

Ottoman National Olympic Society

Turkish National Olympic Committee

Executive committee 
The committee of the TNOC is represented by:
 President: Uğur Erdener
 Vice President: Türker Arslan, Hasan Arat, Nihat Usta
 Secretary General: Neşe Gündoğan
 Treasurer: Abdullah Özkan Mutlugil
 Members: Sezai Bağbaşı, Mustafa Keten, Seyit Bilal Porsun, Abdullah Topaloğlu, Turgay Demirel, Sema Kasapoğlu, Perviz Aran, Elif Özdemir, Ayda Uluç, Kazım Âli Kiremitçioğlu
 President of The Supreme Advisory and Disciplinary Committee: Şefik Sivrikaya

Member federations
The Turkish National Federations are the organizations that coordinate all aspects of their individual sports. They are responsible for training, competition and development of their sports. There are currently 33 Olympic Summer and 5 Winter Sport Federations in Turkey.

See also
 Turkey at the Olympics
 Turkish National Paralympic Committee

References

External links 
 Official website 
 Mustafa Koç Sports Award Judged and endorsed by the Turkish Olympic Committee, honouring the late businessman Mustafa Vehbi Koç.

Turkey
Turkey at the Olympics
Organizations based in Istanbul
Sports organizations established in 1908
Olympic
1908 establishments in the Ottoman Empire